Lalmoni Express (Train no. 751/752) is an intercity train which runs between Dhaka (capital of Bangladesh) and Lalmonirhat District. Lalmoni Express has been considered one of the popular trains since its inception in 2004. The train connects several important cities, such as: Lalmonirhat, Gaibandha, Bogra, Natore with Dhaka. It is one of the long-distance travelling trains of Bangladesh alonging with Drutajan Express, Panchagarh Express, and Ekota Express.

History 

Lalmoni Express made its 1st inaugural run on 7 March 2004 with allocated train no. 751up/752down.  It was introduced as only inter-city train between Lalmonirhat and Dhaka. It has frequent stops than other intercity trains in Bangladesh. However, Lalmonirhat Division of Bangladesh Railway gives top priority to this train for its passenger demand.

Schedule 
Lalmoni Express departs Lalmonirhat railway station at 10:40 (Bangladesh Standard Time) and arrives Dhaka station at 20:55. In  return trip, it departs Dhaka at 22:10 and arrives Lalmonirhat at 08:20. Friday is the weekly holiday of this train. Due to its long distance of travelling, it faces schedule collapse sometimes.

Carriages 
The train currently runs with 14 vacuum brake Coaches. In spite of huge passenger demand, the train didn't get new coaches since its inception.  Bangladesh Railway is thinking to upgrade its coaches in near future by introduction of air brake system.

Locomotive 
Lalmoni Express usually is hauled by a Class 2900 locomotive of Bangladesh Railway. The train can be run with a vacuum brake locomotive.

Stops 
 Kamalapur Railway Station
 Dhaka Airport railway station
 Joydebpur
 Tangail
 Bangabandhu Bridge east
 Shaheed M Monsur Ali
 Ullapara
 Boralbridge
 Azimnagar station
 Natore
 Santahar
 Bogra
 Sonatala
 Bonarpara
 Gaibandha
 Bamandanga
 Pirgachha
 Kaunia
 Tista
 Lalmonirhat Railway Station

References

External links

Named passenger trains of Bangladesh